Put the Rifle Down is a Canadian electronic dance band based in Toronto, Ontario, that were signed to Montreal label Summer Lovers Unlimited. Their debut full-length, Selector, was released in 2009. The band includes Michael Countryman (vocals), Anthony Bruno (drums/percussion), Jordan Bimm (guitar), and Mark Cassidy (synthesizers). The band formed while all four members were studying at the University of Toronto in 2004. NOW magazine considers their sound similar to that of New Order. In 2007, the band had their song Architekt featured on a vinyl-only compilation called Hordes Of Canada that was issued in the UK by Cheap Date Records. The release also included songs by Crystal Castles, We Are Wolves, and Duchess Says and is now out of print. Drowned in Sound described Architekt as "glacial downbeat-pop at its most irresistible" and wrote that Arcade Fire was "an obvious influence".

The band has played the North by Northeast music festival, the CMJ festival, Pop Montreal, and Canadian Music Week.  They were invited to play the 2008 South by Southwest festival in Austin, Texas, but did not make it due to visa problems. Put the Rifle Down has remixed tracks by The Coast and by the French band The Teenagers. Thunderheist remixed Put the Rifle Down's track My Industrial Park.

In September 2011, the band announced it will release a new full-length album, titled New Dance, on October 20, 2011.

Discography 
 Hordes of Canada (Cheap Date Records; 2007) UK Comp, vinyl only, OUT OF PRINT.
 Selector (Summer Lovers Unlimited; 2009) LP, OUT OF PRINT.
 NRG (Independent; 2010) LP.
 New Dance (Independent; 2011) LP.

References

External links
 Put the Rifle Down official site
 Put the Rifle Down at CBC Radio 3

Musical groups established in 2003
Canadian indie rock groups
Musical groups from Toronto
2003 establishments in Ontario